Allis is a surname. Notable people with the surname include:

Conor Allis (born 1990), Irish hurler
Edward P. Allis (1824–1889), American businessman
Edward Phelps Allis (zoologist) (1851–1947), American zoologist
Charles David Allis (born 1951), American molecular biologist
Gilbert J. Allis (c.1879–1932), British philatelist
Janine Allis (born 1965), Australian businesswoman
John Allis (born 1942), American cyclist
Harry Allis (1928–2006), American football player
Louis Allis (1916–1994), American politician
Louis Allis (golfer) (1866–1950), American golfer
Mary Allis (1899–1987), American dealer of art and antiques
Oswald Thompson Allis (1880–1973), American theologian and academic
Thomas Allis (1788–1875), British osteologist and curator
Thomas Henry Allis (1817–1870), British entomologist
Victor Allis (born 1965), Dutch computer scientist
William Allis (1901–1999), American physicist